George Whitby may refer to:

 George Roland Whitby (1878–1966), British tea planter, businessman and member of parliament
 George S. Whitby (1887–1972), head of the University of Akron rubber laboratory